Alvarez Kelly is a 1966 American Western film set in the American Civil War directed by Edward Dmytryk and starring William Holden and Richard Widmark. The picture was based on the historic Beefsteak Raid of September 1864 led by Confederate Major General Wade Hampton III.

Plot
Mexican cattleman Alvarez Kelly (William Holden) is contracted to deliver a herd to the Union Army in Virginia. As he nears the end of his long cattle drive, Kelly is captured by Confederate raiders led by Colonel Tom Rossiter (Richard Widmark). The Confederacy desperately needs the beef to feed its soldiers besieged in Richmond.

Kelly is "persuaded" to help shanghai and deliver the stolen herd to Richmond. Despite the hatred between the two men, they manage to work together. Kelly first teaches Rossiter's men how to drive cattle. Then, they proceed to capture and drive the herd away, despite the efforts of Union officer Major Albert Stedman (Patrick O'Neal). As revenge, Kelly arranges passage for Rossiter's discontented fiancée, Liz Pickering (Janice Rule), on a blockade runner leaving the besieged city.

Cast
 William Holden as Alvarez Kelly
 Richard Widmark as Col. Tom Rossiter
 Janice Rule as Liz Pickering
 Patrick O'Neal as Major Albert Steadman
 Victoria Shaw as Charity Warwick
 Roger C. Carmel as Capt. Angus Ferguson
 Richard Rust as Sergeant Hatcher
 Arthur Franz as Capt. Towers
 Don 'Red' Barry as Lt. Farrow (as Donald Barry)
 Duke Hobbie as John Beaurider
 Harry Carey Jr. as Cpl. Peterson
 Howard Caine as McIntyre
 Mauritz Hugo as Ely Harrison
 Barry Atwater as General Kautz (as G.B. Atwater)
 Robert Morgan as Capt. Williams
 Paul Lukather as Capt. Webster
 Stephanie Hill as Mary Ann
 Indus Arthur as Melinda 
 Clint Ritchie as Union L.t.

Production
The film was shot in the vicinity of Baton Rouge, Louisiana.substituting for central Virginia and the Civil War battlefield areas around the Confederate and state capital of Richmond and Petersburg encircled and under siege in 1864.

Reception
The film was generally well received by critics. Bosley Crowther of The New York Times remarked that it was "a good picture—nice and crisp and tough", praised the script writer Franklin Coen for "blueprinting a fresh idea, and salting it with some tingling, unstereotyped behavior and gristly dialogue". He further praised the cinematography, the casting of Holden and Widmark, which he considered "sardonic perfection",  and added that the "picture perks up beautifully in the ripely-detailed homestretch". Variety praised the action sequences with the cattle stampede but, unlike Crowther, thought there were some issues with the script which they believed "overdevelops some characters and situations, and underdevelops others".

Author John H. Lenihan compares the film to The Good, the Bad, and the Ugly, in that both films "offer no consolation in their vivid deglamorization of war. The heroes, or antiheroes, of both films pursue selfish pecuniary ventures as a conscious alternative to becoming committed in a pointless destructive war".

References

External links
 
 
 
 

1966 films
1966 Western (genre) films
American Civil War films
Films directed by Edward Dmytryk
Columbia Pictures films
Films set in Virginia
1960s historical films
American historical films
1960s English-language films
Films set in Richmond, Virginia
American Western (genre) films
1960s American films